The Europe Zone was one of the three regional zones of the 1965 Davis Cup.

32 teams entered the Europe Zone, with the winner going on to compete in the Inter-Zonal Zone against the winners of the America Zone and Eastern Zone. Spain defeated South Africa in the final and progressed to the Inter-Zonal Zone.

Draw

First round

Sweden vs. Poland

Italy vs. Portugal

Hungary vs. Brazil

West Germany vs. Switzerland

Luxembourg vs. Turkey

Spain vs. Greece

Belgium vs. Chile

Netherlands vs. South Africa

Ireland vs. Denmark

Great Britain vs. Israel

Yugoslavia vs. Morocco

Finland vs. Austria

Second round

Sweden vs. Czechoslovakia

Italy vs. Brazil

West Germany vs. Luxembourg

Spain vs. Chile

Norway vs. South Africa

Denmark vs. Great Britain

Yugoslavia vs. Rhodesia

Austria vs. France

Quarterfinals

Czechoslovakia vs. Italy

Spain vs. West Germany

Great Britain vs. South Africa

France vs. Yugoslavia

Semifinals

Czechoslovakia vs. Spain

France vs. South Africa

Final

Spain vs. South Africa

References

External links
Davis Cup official website

Davis Cup Europe/Africa Zone
Europe Zone
Davis Cup